Class A airfields were World War II military installations constructed to specifications laid down by the British Air Ministry Directorate-General of Works (AMDGW).  Intended for use by heavy bombers and transports, they were the standard air base design for the Royal Air Force as well as U.S. Army Air Forces units operating from the UK.

Upon the entry of the US into the war a number of RAF Class A bases were transferred to the U.S. Eighth Air Force for use as heavy bomber bases with the RAF units formerly occupying them being redeployed to other RAF bomber airfields, and U.S. Army Engineer Units constructed more airfields to this standard or brought earlier airfields up to this specification by lengthening runways, etc. Many units of the U.S. Ninth Air Force also flew from Class A airfields.  The term Class 'A' came about because, quite often, the resultant aerial shot of the crossed runways would look like the letter A.

Design
The specifications set by the British Air Ministry in August 1942 called for three converging strips, each containing a concrete runway optimally placed—if practicable at the site—at 60-degree angles to each other in a triangular pattern. The longest strip was designated the main strip and aligned southwest to northeast wherever possible, this being chosen to allow aircraft to take off and land into the prevailing wind. The other two runways were to allow safe takeoff and landing from either end when the wind was blowing from other directions. The primary consideration was for operational safety for any type of aircraft then in operation or under development.

A  area was cleared and leveled on either side of the perimeter track.

The purpose of the hardstands was to allow aircraft to be dispersed some distance from each other so that an air attack on the airfield would be less likely to destroy all the aircraft at once. Dispersal also minimised the chance of collateral damage to other aircraft should an accident occur whilst bombing-up. Hardstands were either of the Frying-Pan or Spectacle Loop type, with the Spectacle type being the easiest in which to manoeuvre aircraft.

A concrete runway  in width was centred on the strip, with a length of at least  for the main strip and at least  for the secondary strips. On each side of the strip the field was cleared of obstructions and leveled an additional . Gradients for the strips were a maximum 1 in 80 longitudinally and 1 in 60 transversely. In addition, an area at the end of each runway was cleared of obstructions at an angle of fifteen degrees outward from each side on a rising imaginary plane of 1 in 50 to provide a flightway called a funnel.

Construction
The material needs for building runways suitable for heavy bombers were approximately 18,000 tons of dry cement and 90,000 tons of aggregate. Expected stress factors of 2,000 pounds per square inch led to runway thicknesses of six to nine inches of concrete slab laid on a hardcore base, covered with a layer of asphalt. In areas where there was no natural rock, such as East Anglia, stone had to be imported for the hardcore. Up to six trains ran daily from London to east Anglia carrying rubble from destroyed buildings in Luftwaffe raids. This material was used as hardcore for the airfields.

Operational use

Nine airfields (Alconbury, Bassingbourn, Chelveston, Grafton Underwood, Kimbolton, Molesworth, Podington, Polebrook, and Thurleigh) were allotted to the Eighth Air Force but had been completed prior to the Class A standard for runway lengths.  These were brought to Class A standards in 1942 and early 1943 by extending their runways, repositioning their perimeter tracks, and adding additional hardstands.

Class A airfields were also characterized by standardized technical site requirements for repair, maintenance and storage of aircraft.  Two T-2 type metal hangars (240 feet long by 115 feet wide by 29 feet high) were the standard for most airfields, although a few pre-1942 bases had three T-2 hangars and Thurleigh had four. Three bases (Chelveston, Molesworth, and Polebrook) also had a J Type brick-and-metal hangar (300' X 151') in addition to a pair of T2's, and Bassingbourn, which had been a pre-war RAF bomber station, had four C type brick hangars measuring 300 by 152 feet

Several airfields had their runways widened and extended in length for emergency landing of damaged bombers after operations over Germany, these airfields, RAF Woodbridge, RAF Carnaby, and RAF Manston being designated as "Emergency Landing Grounds" – ELG's. These ELG airfields had some of the first fitments of the fog-dispersing installation, FIDO.

Post-war motorsport use

With the end of World War II and the resurgence of the sport of motor racing several former airfields were used as race tracks, including Silverstone, Castle Combe, Goodwood and Thruxton.

Most race tracks on former airfields use the encircling perimeter track, although the main straight at Snetterton is laid down on a secondary runway, and the main runway is used at Santa Pod Raceway (formerly RAF Podington) for drag racing.

See also
List of Royal Air Force stations
Advanced Landing Ground

References

Citations

Bibliography

 
 
 
 

World War II airfields
World War II strategic bombing
Aerial warfare strategy
Royal Air Force stations